The Teddy Bear is a 1994 French-Italian thriller-drama film directed by Jacques Deray. It is based on the novel L'ours en peluche by Georges Simenon.

Cast 

 Alain Delon : Jean Rivière
 Francesca Dellera : Chantal
 Laure Killing : Christine Rivière
 Alexandra Winisky : Axelle Rivière
 Madeleine Robinson : Mother of Jean
 Claudia Pandolfi : Claudia Spinelli
 Mattia Sbragia : Giorgio Spinelli
 Regina Bianchi : Grandmother of Claudia
 Paolo Bonacelli : Novacek
 Franco Interlenghi : Sylvain

References

External links

1996 films
Films directed by Jacques Deray
French thriller drama films
Italian thriller drama films
Films based on Belgian novels
Films based on works by Georges Simenon
1990s thriller drama films
1996 drama films
1990s French films